Electra House is a building at 84 Moorgate, London, England. It is notable as the wartime London base of Cable & Wireless Limited, and office of Department EH — one of the three British organisations that merged in World War II to form the Special Operations Executive.

Not to be confused with Electra House in Brixton, the depot for London Underground Train Operators based at Brixton on the Victoria Line

History

Architect John Belcher designed the building, which opened in 1902 as accommodation for the Eastern Telegraph Company. On 11 May 1933, the company transferred administrative functions to a new Electra House building on Victoria Embankment.  This became the administrative headquarters for the renamed Imperial and International Communications, which became Cable & Wireless Limited in 1934.

The Foreign Office created a propaganda organisation known as Department EH, after its headquarters Electra House. Department EH was involved in the monitoring of foreign embassy communications, and cabling run between both buildings ensured continuance of this service even following direct bomb damage during World War II.

The remaining Cable & Wireless operations were finally moved from the Moorgate building to Victoria Embankment when the original building suffered severe bomb damage during the World War II.  Electra House (Victoria Embankment) was itself subsequently hit by a V-1 flying bomb in July 1944, but this resulted in only three fatalities among the 400 attending staff and did not stop daily operations.
Electra House continued to be a hub for telecommunications activities by its eventual owners, BT Group, until its final demolition  and replacement by a new building, now occupied by British American Tobacco.
The Electra House Retired Colleagues Association, formed from staff of Electra House (Victoria Embankment) and other BT Group offices, continue to stay in contact and meet.

Following its repair from bomb damage, City of London College moved into Electra House in 1944 and still occupies the building, although it is now known as London Metropolitan University.

References

External links
 The Political Intelligence Department and Department Electra House

Grade II listed buildings in the City of London
British Telecom buildings and structures
London Metropolitan University
Special Operations Executive